The following is a list of cast members who have appeared in the American reality television series Ex on the Beach.

Cast

Bold indicates original cast member; all other cast were brought into the series as an ex.

Table key
 Key:  = "Cast member" returns to the beach for the second time.

Other appearances

16 and Pregnant
 Farrah Abraham

The Amazing Race Australia
Holly MacAlpine – season 6
Jake O'Brien – season 6

American Idol
 Daniel Noriega
 Ryan Gallagher

Are You Smarter than a 5th Grader?
 Danielle Cohen

Are You the One?
 Shanley McIntee – season 1
 Anthony Bartolotte – season 2
 Nelson Thomas – season 3
 Devin Walker-Molaghan – season 3
 Cameron Kolbo – season 4
 Alicia Wright – season 5
 Taylor Selfridge – season 5
 Derrick Henry – season 5
 Andre Siemers – season 5
 Shannon Duffy – season 5
 Tyranny Todd – season 5
 Joe Torgerson – season 6
 Malcolm Drummer – season 6
 Diandra Delgado – season 6
 Nurys Mateo – season 6
 Geles Rodriguez – season 6
 Anthony Martin – season 6
 Kenya Scott – season 7
 Tevin Grant – season 7

Are You the One? Second Chances
 Devin Walker-Molaghan
 Shanley McIntee
 Cameron Kolbo
 Alicia Wright
 Derrick Henry

The Bachelor
 Jasmine Goode – season 21

The Bachelorette
 Chad Johnson – season 12
 Chase McNary – season 12
 Daniel Maguire – season 12

Bachelor in Paradise
 Chad Johnson – season 3
 Daniel Maguire – seasons 3 and 4
 Jasmine Goode – season 4
 Chase McNary – season 6

Bachelor in Paradise Australia
 Daniel Maguire – seasons 1 and 2 

Bad Girls Club
 Janelle Shanks – Bad Girls Club: Miami
 Angela Babicz – Bad Girls Club: Twisted Sisters

Big Brother
 Da'Vonne Rogers — seasons 17, 18 and 22
 Paulie Calafiore — season 18
 Jozea Flores — season 18
 Corey Brooks – season 18
 Mark Jensen — season 19
 Elena Davies – season 19
 Kathryn Dunn – season 21

Big Brother Canada
 Jamar Lee — season 8
 Minh-Ly Nguyen-Cao — season 8

Big Brother: Over the Top
 Morgan Willett
 Monte Massongill

Catching Kelce
 Maya Benberry

Celebrity Big Brother UK
 Farrah Abraham — series 16
 Aubrey O'Day — series 18
 Chad Johnson — series 20

The Challenge

The Challenge: All Stars
 Jemmye Carroll — season 1

The Challenge: Champs vs. Stars
 Cory Wharton — season 1
 Devin Walker-Molaghan — season 2
 Jozea Flores — season 2

Double Shot at Love
 Derynn Paige — season 1
 Ricky Rogers — season 2

Famously Single
 Aubrey O'Day — season 1
 Chad Johnson — season 2

Fire Island
 Cheyenne Parker

Glam Masters
 La Demi Martinez

How Far Is Tattoo Far?
 Cory Wharton — season 2

Inst@famous
 Alexa "Lexi" Kaplan
 Allie Kaplan

Lindsay Lohan's Beach Club
 Mike Mulderrig

Love Island UK
 Georgia Steel – series 4
 Niall Aslam – series 4
 Sam Bird – series 4

Love Island
 Caro Viee – season 1
 Emily Salch – season 1
 Kyra Green – season 1
 Ray Gantt – season 1
 Sher Suarez – season 2

Making the Band
 Aubrey O'Day

Marriage Boot Camp
 Aubrey O'Day – seasons 5 and 13
 Farrah Abraham – season 10

Paradise Hotel
 David Barta – season 3

The Real World
 Jemmye Carroll — The Real World: New Orleans
 Marie Roda — The Real World: St. Thomas
 Marlon Williams — The Real World: Portland
 Ashley Ceasar — Real World: Ex-Plosion
 Cory Wharton — Real World: Ex-Plosion
 Nicole Zanatta — Real World: Skeletons

RuPaul's Drag Race
 Adore Delano — season 6

Survivor
 Jay Starrett — Survivor: Millennials vs. Gen X

Strut
 Arisce Wanzer

Teen Mom
 Farrah Abraham
 Simon Saran
 Cory Wharton
 Taylor Selfridge

Too Hot to Handle
 Bryce Hirschberg – season 1
 Nicole O'Brien – season 1

What Happens at The Abbey
 Murray Swanby
 Cory Zwierzynski
 Billy Reilich

World of Dance
 Jonathan Troncoso – season 3

References

Ex on the Beach
Cast members